Sharif College of Engineering and Technology (SCET) was founded in 2010 as a project of Sharif Trust, a Not-for-Profit organization formed in 1995 under the Societies Registration Act of 1860. The College is located in Sharif Medical City, in front of the Sharif family farmhouses, Jati Umra, Lahore. The College is affiliated with the University of Engineering and Technology, Lahore. The college offers three degree programs: 1. B.Sc Chemical Engineering 2. B.Sc Electrical Engineering 3. B.Sc Computer Sciences

Since the time of its founding, students of this college have participated in national and international competitions.

Board of Trustees: 1. Mian Muhammad Nawaz Sharif (Prime Minister of Pakistan) 2. Mian Muhammad Shahbaz Sharif (Chief Minister of Punjab)

Other educational institutions of the Sharif Trust. 1. Sharif Medical and Dental College 2. OASIS School for Autism  3. Sharif Education Complex (Montessori to O & A Level)

References

Engineering universities and colleges in Pakistan
Universities and colleges in Lahore